Cambarellus patzcuarensis is a small, threatened species of crayfish in the family Cambaridae. It is endemic to Michoacán in Mexico and often kept in aquariums.

Description
It measures  in total length, including claws. Most specimens found in the wild are brown, sometimes with a gray or blue tint. Cambarellus patzcuarensis var. "Orange" (Mexican dwarf crayfish, sometimes Mexican dwarf orange crayfish) is an orange-coloured mutation often held in aquariums, but this form is rarely found in the wild.

Distribution
Besides in Lake Pátzcuaro, C. patzcuarensis also occurs in springs in Chapultepec, Opopeo and Tzurumutaro.

Conservation
C. patzcuarensis is listed as an endangered species on the IUCN Red List.

References 

Cambaridae
Endemic crustaceans of Mexico
Crustaceans described in 1943
Freshwater crustaceans of North America